Miss You Like Crazy is a 2010 Filipino romance film starring John Lloyd Cruz and Bea Alonzo. It was Star Cinema's post-valentine presentation for 2010.

The film was released in the United States in select theatres in Los Angeles, CA and in Honolulu, HI.

Plot
The story is a flashback of a five-years-love affair (2005 to 2010) involving the characters of Allan Alvarez (John Lloyd Cruz) and Mia Samonte (Bea Alonzo).  The opening scene was in a Pasig River ferry boat.  One of the passengers, Allan, was sad, and confused if he really loved his then live-in partner, Daphne Recto (Maricar Reyes). While another passenger, Mia, was downtrodden by family problems. To express her heartaches, Mia would write messages on stones and would leave them anywhere. Allan happened to pick up several of those, prompting for them to get acquainted when one day, he thought she was about to commit suicide due to something she wrote in one of the stones while crying. That's how their romantic story began.
 
Later, in one of their trysts, they met an old man (Noel Trinidad) in Paco Park who predicted that they were meant for each other and would end up together, although it would take a difficult five-year ride.   
 
Allan was torn between two loves. Although he knew that he loved Mia more, he procrastinated in his choice.

Mia left for Malaysia.  Two years after, when Allan  finally broke free from his indecision, he went to Malaysia to look for Mia only to find out that she was already engaged to another guy.  It was now Mia's turn to make a choice.  She chose the new guy who loved her so much and the one she knew could help her support her family, even though she honestly knew in her heart that she still loved Allan.
 
Allan did not lose hope.  He patiently waited for Mia for another three years.  He firmly believed that she would come back to him as predicted by the old man earlier in the story.  True enough, the Malaysian guy let Mia go as he was aware of who Mia truly wanted and her intention of choosing him over Allan.  On the very same date foreseen by the old man, Mia returned to the Philippines, saw Allan waiting for her, and they embraced each other.

Cast of characters

Main cast 
John Lloyd Cruz as Alan Alvarez
Bea Alonzo as Mia Samonte

Supporting cast 
Maricar Reyes as Daphne Recto
Gerald Hans Isaac as Mir
Ryan Eigenmann as Nick
Ina Feleo as Lianne
Ketchup Eusebio as Jona
Tirso Cruz III  as Ramon Recto
Bembol Roco as Efren Samonte
Maritess Joaquin as Agnes Recto
Sylvia Sanchez as Sol Samonte
JM De Guzman as JM Recto (as Juan Miguel de Guzman)
Diane Medina as Anette Samonte
Sabella Bte Mustapha Kamal as Young Azrina
Salsabil Bte Mustapha Kamil as Child Azrina
Jins Shamsuddin as Mir's Grandfather (as Tan Sri Jins Shamsuddin)
Neil Coleta as Micoy Samonte
Patrick Moreno as Gbert Samonte
Jane Oineza as Karen Samonte (as Elizabeth Jane Oineza)
Noel Trinidad as Ulysses
Sid Lucero as Stephan
Justin Cuyugan as Aries
Irene Contreras as Nick's Sister
Ed Bouffard as Nick's Father (as Eduardo Bouffard)
Jun Urbano as Temi
Malou de Guzman as Cristy
Harish as Party Guest (uncredited)

Reception

Soundtrack
The film had two versions of the song, Miss You Like Crazy originally by Natalie Cole. The remake version was sung by Erik Santos, while the other was sung by Aiza Seguerra.

Box office
According to Star Cinema, the film opened with a ₱18 Million gross. In a span of five days, Miss You Like Crazy has grossed more than ₱114 million. According to Box Office Mojo, the film already grossed up to $3,183,529 (or ₱143 Million) in its six weeks of running.

Art Directors: Lesley Anne Padilla & Gino Valloyas
Set directors: Eirenne Reyes & Erwin Abdon
Props master: Ryan Sabio

Awards

References

External links 
 MYLC Official Website
 

2010 films
Films directed by Cathy Garcia-Molina
2010s Tagalog-language films
2010s English-language films
Star Cinema romance films
Philippine romance films
Films shot in Kuala Lumpur
Films shot in Malaysia
2010 romance films
2010 multilingual films
Philippine multilingual films